Dolenja Vas is a village southwest of Cerknica in the Inner Carniola region of Slovenia.

Name
The name Dolenja vas literally means 'lower village'. Dolenja vas and names like it are quite common in Slovenia and other Slavic countries, and they indicate that the settlement lay at a lower elevation than nearby settlements. It lies about  lower than neighboring Cerknica. The village was known as Niederdorf in German in the past.

History
Ancient settlement of the area is testified by the discovery of the remains of a Hallstatt- or Roman-era fortress on Tržišče Hill above the village. The site included a large cache of weapons. An Urnfield burial site was discovered on the southeast slope of the hill and was excavated in 1877. Southwest of this there was a second fortress, the embankments of which are well preserved.

Mass grave
Dolenja Vas is the site of a mass grave associated with the Second World War. The Balant Valleys Shaft Mass Grave is located southwest of the settlement.

Church
The local church, built southwest of the settlement, is dedicated to Saint Lawrence and belongs to the Parish of Cerknica. The church dates from 1616 and contains a gilded altar dedicated to Saint Margaret.

Notable people
Notable people that were born or lived in Dolenja Vas include:
Lojze Perko (1909–1980), artist
Franjo Sterle (1889–1930), painter

References

External links

Dolenja Vas on Geopedia

Populated places in the Municipality of Cerknica